Tiemo Wölken (born 5 December 1985) is a German lawyer and politician who has been a Member of the European Parliament (MEP) since 14 November 2016. He is a member of the Social Democratic Party, part of the Party of European Socialists.

Early life and education
Wölken was educated at the Halepaghen Grammar School before studying law at the University of Osnabrück, where he specialised in European public law. He also completed a supplementary course in economics at the University of Osnabrück before completing a Master in International Law in 2013 at the University of Hull in England.

Political career
Wölken became a Member of the European Parliament when he replaced Matthias Groote who resigned to run for local office in 2016. During his first term, he served on the Committee on the Environment, Public Health and Food Safety (2016-2017) and on the Committee on Budgets (2017-2019). Following the 2019 elections, he moved to the Committee on Legal Affairs, where he serves as his parliamentary group’s coordinator. He is also the Parliament’s lead rapporteur on health technology assessment. In 2021, Wölken and Roberta Metsola co-authored a resolution to protect journalists and critical voices from strategic lawsuits against public participation, which was overwhelmingly endorsed by the Parliament.

In addition to his committee assignments, Wölken has been part of the Parliament’s delegations to the Euro-Latin American Parliamentary Assembly (2016-2019), the EU-Mexico Joint Parliamentary Committee (2016-2019) and to Canada (since 2019). He co-chairs the MEP Interest Group on Antimicrobial Resistance (AMR). He is also a member of the European Parliament Intergroup on Anti-Corruption, the European Parliament Intergroup on Seas, Rivers, Islands and Coastal Areas, the European Parliament Intergroup on Artificial Intelligence and Digital, the European Internet Forum and the Responsible Business Conduct Working Group.

Wölken was nominated by his party as delegate to the Federal Convention for the purpose of electing the President of Germany in 2022.

Other activities
 Business Forum of the Social Democratic Party of Germany, Member of the Political Advisory Board
 Education and Science Workers' Union (GEW), Member

References

Living people
1985 births
Alumni of the University of Hull
German expatriates in the United Kingdom
Social Democratic Party of Germany MEPs
MEPs for Germany 2014–2019
MEPs for Germany 2019–2024
Politicians from Lower Saxony
Osnabrück University alumni